This is a list of awards and nominations received by Antonis Remos.

Arion Music Awards
Remos received 12 awards from 19 nominations.

Cyprus Music Awards

MAD Video Music Awards

Pop Corn Music Awards

Status Man of the Year Awards

References

Remos, Antonis
Antonis Remos albums